The 1888 Arkansas gubernatorial election was held on September 3, 1888.

Incumbent Democratic Governor Simon Pollard Hughes Jr. was defeated for re-nomination.

Democratic nominee James Philip Eagle defeated Union Labor and Republican fusion nominee Charles M. Norwood with 54.09% of the vote.

General election

Candidates
James Philip Eagle, Democratic, farmer, former Speaker of the Arkansas House of Representatives, president of the Arkansas Baptist State Convention
Charles M. Norwood, Union Labor, former Confederate General and State Senator

The Republican Party endorsed Norwood.

Results

Notes

References

1888
Arkansas
Gubernatorial